Yelena Rabigovna Sokolovskaya (née Akhaminova) (born 5 October 1961 in Sverdlovsk) is a former volleyball female player and coach. As a player for the Soviet Union she is an Olympic gold medallist (in 1980) and European champion (in 1979).

Player career
Sokolovskaya played from 1977 until 2002 for clubs in the Russian SFSR, Ukrainian SSR, Finland, Ukraine, Poland and Europe. She won many titles including the CEV Women's Champions League, Cup Winners Cup, USSR Championship, USSR Cup, Polish Championship and Polish Cup. 

She played for the Soviet Union national team at junior and senior level from 1979 to 1983, taking part of the World Championship (in 1982) and becoming Olympic champion (in 1980), World Cup bronze medallist (in 1981), European champion (in 1979) and European silver medallist (in 1981 and in 1983).

Clubs
  Uralochka Sverdlovsk (1977–1982)
  Medin Odessa (1982–1989)
  Haukiputaan Heitto (1989–1993)
  Dinamo-Jinestra Odessa (1993–1994)
  Chemik Police (1994–1995)
  ? (1995–2002)
  Khimik Yuzhne (2002–2003)

Coach career
In 2006, Sokolovskaya was appointed head coach of Ukrainian women's volleyball club VC Jinestra (previously called Dinamo-Jinestra Odessa). She won twice the Ukrainian Cup and finished four times as runners up of the Ukrainian Super League during her six seasons as coach, before the club folded in 2012.

Honours and awards
 Merited Master of Sports of the USSR (1980)

Player
National team
Junior
 1979 Women's Junior European Volleyball Championship – Gold medal
 1979 Summer Universiade – Gold medal

Senior
 1979 European Championship – Gold medal
 1980 Olympic Games – Gold medal
 1979 European Championship – Silver medal
 1981 World Cup – Bronze medal
 1983 European Championship – Silver medal

Club
 CEV Women's Champions League (champion with Uralochka Sverdlovsk in 1980–81 and 1981–82)
 Cup Winners Cup (champion with Medin Odessa in 1982–83)
 USSR Championship (champion with Uralochka Sverdlovsk in 1978, 1979, 1980, 1981 and 1982)
 USSR Cup (champion with Medin Odessa in 1983)
 Polish Championship (champion with Chemik Police in 1994–95)
 Polish Cup (champion with Chemik Police in 1994–95)

Coach
Club
 Ukrainian Cup (champion with Dinamo-Jinestra Odessa in 2009–10 and 2010–11)

References

1961 births
Living people
Sportspeople from Yekaterinburg
Ukrainian women's volleyball players
Soviet women's volleyball players
Olympic volleyball players of the Soviet Union
Volleyball players at the 1980 Summer Olympics
Olympic gold medalists for the Soviet Union
Olympic medalists in volleyball
Medalists at the 1980 Summer Olympics
Honoured Masters of Sport of the USSR
Soviet expatriate sportspeople in Finland
Ukrainian expatriate sportspeople in Finland
Ukrainian expatriate sportspeople in Poland
Volleyball coaches
Universiade medalists in volleyball
Universiade gold medalists for the Soviet Union
K. D. Ushinsky South Ukrainian National Pedagogical University alumni